The 1960 NBA playoffs was the postseason tournament of the National Basketball Association's 1959-60 season. The tournament concluded with the Eastern Division champion Boston Celtics defeating the Western Division champion St. Louis Hawks 4 games to 3 in the NBA Finals.

This was the second straight and third overall NBA title for Boston, who got revenge for the Hawks' win over them in 1958. The 1960 Finals was the third Celtics–Hawks Finals in the past four years.

Bracket

Division Semifinals

Eastern Division Semifinals

(2) Philadelphia Warriors vs. (3) Syracuse Nationals

 George Yardley's final NBA game.

This was the seventh playoff meeting between these two teams, with the 76ers/Nationals winning four of the first six meetings.

Western Division Semifinals

(2) Detroit Pistons vs. (3) Minneapolis Lakers 

 Dick McGuire's final NBA game.

This was the seventh playoff meeting between these two teams, with the Lakers winning five of the first six meetings.

Division Finals

Eastern Division Finals

(1) Boston Celtics vs. (2) Philadelphia Warriors

This was the second playoff meeting between these two teams, with the Celtics winning the first meeting.

Western Division Finals

(1) St. Louis Hawks vs. (3) Minneapolis Lakers

 Slater Martin's final NBA game.

This was the fourth playoff meeting between these two teams, with the Hawks winning two of the first three meetings.

NBA Finals: (E1) Boston Celtics vs. (W1) St. Louis Hawks

 Bill Russell's 40 rebounds set a single-game Finals record for an individual player.

This was the third playoff meeting between these two teams, with both teams splitting the first two meetings.

References

External links
Basketball-Reference.com's 1960 NBA Playoffs page

National Basketball Association playoffs
Playoffs

fi:NBA-kausi 1959–1960#Pudotuspelit